The Boston Society of Film Critics Award for Best Film is one of the annual film awards given by the Boston Society of Film Critics.

Winners

1980s

1990s

2000s

2010s

2020s

References

Boston Society of Film Critics Awards
Awards for best film
Lists of films by award